C-word, or c word may refer to:

 Cunt, a vulgarism for the female genitalia 
 Cancer, a euphemism for the illness

Arts and entertainment

Film and television
 "The C Word", an episode of Rollergirls
 "The C Word", an episode of 30 Rock
 "The C-Word" (House), an episode of House
 "The 'C' Word", an episode of Herman's Head
 "The C Word", a 2007 documentary from BBC Three about the word "cunt"
 The C Word (2016 film), a documentary about the effort to prevent cancer

Books
 The C-Word, a book and a BBC television drama by Lisa Lynch about her breast cancer